Chino Valley Medical Center (CVMC) is a 126-bed acute care facility in Chino, California. CVMC is owned and operated by Prime Healthcare Services, Inc. (PHS), a hospital management company in Ontario, California. PHS was founded in 2001 by Prem Reddy, who acts as its present chairman of the board.  The emergency department at Chino Valley receives about 37,000 visits each year. The hospital is accredited by the American Osteopathic Association (AOA) and Healthcare Facilities Accreditation Program (HFAP).

In 2004, US Bankruptcy Courts, Riverside, awarded PHS management of CVMC pursuant to Chapter 11 bankruptcy proceedings.

Medical education
Chino Valley Medical Center operates an Allopathic family medicine residency program along with a podiatric medicine & surgery residency.

References

External links
 
 This hospital in the CA Healthcare Atlas A project by OSHPD

Hospital buildings completed in 1972
Chino, California
Hospitals in San Bernardino County, California
Prime Healthcare Services
Hospitals established in 1972